Reuterella helvimacula is a species of Psocoptera from Elipsocidae family that can be found in United Kingdom and Ireland. The species are brownish-orange.

Habitat
The species feeds on beech, birch, blackthorn, elm, hawthorn, larch, oak, pine, and sycamore. It also feeds on fruits such as horse chestnut and lime.

References

Stenopsocidae
Insects described in 1901
Psocoptera of Europe